= Sperumalpatti =

Coordinates: 10°03′02.6″N 78°01′33.6″E

Sperumalpatti is a large village situated near Madurai District of Tamil Nadu, India.
